Steinar is a common name in Norway and Iceland. The name originates from Proto-Scandinavian StainawarijaR which means "stone guardian".

It may refer to:

Given name
Steinar Baldursson (born 1995), simply known as Steinar, Icelandic singer
Steinar Aase (born 1955), Norwegian football (soccer) player
Steinar Dagur Adolfsson (born 1970), Icelandic football (soccer) player
Steinar Amundsen (born 1945), Norwegian sprint canoer
Steinar Aspli (born 1957), Norwegian politician
Steinar Bastesen (born 1945), Norwegian politician
Steinar Bjølbakk (born 1946), Norwegian ice hockey player
Steinar Birgisson (born 1955), Icelandic handball player
Steinar Bragi (born 1975), Icelandic writer
Steinar Ege (born 1972), Norwegian handball player
Steinar Eikum (born 1958), Norwegian bass player, original member of Norwegian hard rock band TNT
Steinar Gil (born 1943), Norwegian philologist and diplomat
Steinar Gullvåg (born 1946), Norwegian politician
Steinar Hansson (1947–2004), Norwegian journalist and publisher
Steinar Hoen (born 1971), Norwegian high jumper
Steinar Imsen (born 1944), Norwegian historian
Steinar Johansen (born 1972), Norwegian speed skater
Steinar Lem (1951–2009), Norwegian environmental activist, author 
Steinar Løding (born 1950), Norwegian novelist
Steinar Lone (born 1955), Norwegian translator
Steinar Sverd Johnsen (born 1972), Norwegian keyboardist and composer
Steinar Maribo (born 1942), Norwegian politician
Steinar Ness (born 1959), Norwegian politician 
Steinar Nilsen (born 1972), Norwegian football coach
Steinar Ofsdal (born 1948), Norwegian composer, musician, flute player 
Steinar Opstad (born 1971), Norwegian poet
Steinar Pedersen (born 1975), Norwegian football (soccer) player
Steinar Pedersen (politician) (born 1947), Norwegian politician
Steinar Raknes (born 1975), Norwegian jazz musician
Steinar Reiten (born 1963), Norwegian politician 
Steinar Schjøtt (1844-1920), Norwegian educator, philologist and lexicographer
Steinar Stjernø (born 1945), Norwegian academic
Steinar Stokke (born 1955), Norwegian businessperson and former civil servant
Steinar Tenden (born 1978), Norwegian football (soccer) player
Steinar Tjomsland (born 1948), Norwegian Supreme Court Justice
Steinar Aadnekvam (born 1984), Norwegian jazzguitarist

Middle name
Håkon Steinar Giil (born 1943), Norwegian politician
Odd Steinar Holøs (1922–2001), Norwegian politician 
Olav Steinar Namtvedt (born 1947), Norwegian politician 
Per Steinar Osmundnes (born 1980), Norwegian politician

See also
Steinar (disambiguation)

References